The Northern Illinois Huskies women's basketball team is the college basketball team that represent Northern Illinois University (NIU) in DeKalb, Illinois, United States. The school's team currently competes in the Mid-American Conference (MAC). The team last played in the NCAA Division I women's basketball tournament in 1995. The Huskies are coached by Lisa Carlsen.

Season-by-season records

Division I postseason results

NCAA tournament
The Huskies have appeared in five NCAA tournaments. Their combined record is 2–5.

National Invitation tournament
The Huskies have appeared in two National Invitation Tournaments. Their combined record is 1–3.

AIAW tournament
The Huskies have appeared in one AIAW tournament. Their record is 1–1.

Coaching staff
On June 30, 2015, the Huskies announced Lisa Carlsen as the next women's basketball head coach.
Lisa Carlsen – Head Coach
Kierra McCleary – Assistant Coach
John McGinty – Assistant Coach
Adam Tandez – Assistant Coach
Jazz Weaver – Director of Basketball Operations
Takima Keane – Graduate Assistant

See also
NIU Huskies men's basketball
Mid-American Conference women's basketball tournament

References

External links